Pradhan Mantri Gramin Awas Yojana, previously Indira Awas Yojana, is a social welfare programme, created by the Indian Government, to provide housing for the rural poor in India. A similar scheme for urban poor was launched in 2015 as Housing for All by 2022. Indira Awas Yojana was launched in 1985 by Rajiv Gandhi, the Prime Minister of India, as one of the major flagship programs of the Ministry of Rural Development to construct houses for the Below Poverty Line population in the villages.

Overview 
These houses are equipped with facilities such as toilet, LPG connection, electricity connection, and drinking water [convergence with other schemes e.g. Swachh Bharat Abhiyan toilets, Ujjwala Yojana LPG gas connection, Saubhagya Yojana electricity connection, etc.]. The houses are allotted in the name of the woman or jointly between husband and wife. The construction of the houses is the sole responsibility of the beneficiary and engagement of contractors is strictly prohibited but in cases where beneficiary is physically disabled then it is the responsibility of block level officer to provide full assistance in construction of house under PMAY gramin. Sanitary latrine and smokeless Chullah are required to be constructed along with each IAY house for which additional financial assistance is provided from "Total Sanitation Campaign" and "Rajiv Gandhi Grameen Vidyutikaran Yojana" ( Which is now subsumed by Deen Dayal Upadhaya Gram Jyoti Yojana ) respectively. This scheme, operating since 1985, provides subsidies and cash-assistance to people in villages to construct their houses, themselves.

History
Started in 1985 as part of the Rural Landless Employment Guarantee Programme (RLEGP), Indira Awas Yojana (IAY) was subsumed in Jawahar Rozgar Yojana (JRY) in 1989 and has been operating as an independent scheme since 1 January 1996. In 1993-94 this scheme was extended to Non SC/ST categories also. From 1995 to 1996 the scheme has been further extended to widows or next-of-kin of defense personnel killed in action, ex-servicemen and retired members of the paramilitary forces who wish to live in rural areas as long as they meet basic eligibility criteria.

Given that India has been historically a populous and poor country, the need of proper housing for the refugees and villagers has been a focus of Government's welfare schemes since the time of India's independence. As a result, various welfare schemes like House Sites cum Construction Assistance Scheme have been ongoing since the 1950s. However, it was only in the 1983 that a focused fund for creation of housing for scheduled castes (SCs), scheduled tribes (STs) and freed bonded labour was set up under Rural Landless Employment Guarantee Programme (RLEGP). This gave birth to IAY in the fiscal year 1985–86.

"Indira Awas Yojana" (IAY) was launched by Rajiv Gandhi, the then Prime Minister of India in 1985 and was restructured as "Pradhan Mantri Gramin Awas Yojana" (PMGAY) in 2015.

Purpose

The broad purpose of the scheme is to provide financial assistance to some of the weakest sections of society for them to upgrade or construct the house of respectable quality for their personal living. The vision of the government is to replace all temporary (kutcha ) houses from Indian villages by 2017 (house in which 0, 1, 2 wall are kutcha  with kutcha  roof..

Implementation
The funds are allocated to the states based on 75% weightage of rural housing shortage and 25% weightage of poverty ratio. The housing shortage is as per the official published figures of Registrar General of India based on the 2001 Census.

A software called "AWAAS Soft" was launched in July 2010 to assist in improved administration of this scheme.

Eligibility 
All the below categories are automatically included under PM awas yojana gramin 

 List of kutcha house under  PM awas yojana gramin is prepared on the basis of Housing deprivation parameter in the Socio economic and caste censes 2011.
 Then this list is confirmed by the gram Shabhas and panchayat level, they will make deletion or addition of any household who is left outside parameters of SECC 2011.
 Kutcha houses having 0, 1, 2 rooms with kutcha roof are included under PM awas yojana gramin
 Households without any shelter are covered PM awas yojana or PM rural.
 Destitute living on the alms are covered under PM awas yojana gramin.
 Manual scavenger are also included.
 Primitive tribal groups are included under PM awas yojana gramin.
 Legally released bounded laborers are covered under PM awas yojana gramin.

Who are not eligible 
There are total 13 parameters set by government of India and households with kutcha house of 0, 1, 2 rooms and kutcha roof but are fulfilling any one of the 13 parameters are kept excluded from this scheme.

 Households having Two. three or four wheeler and motorized boat are excluded from PM awas yojana gramin.
 Households having mechanized three or four wheeler agriculture or allied equipment are also excluded from PM awas yojana gramin.
 Kisan credit card holder having limit of 50000 rupees are also kept outside PM awas yojana gramin.
 Households having any government employee are also kept outside.
 If any member of the family is earning more than 10000 rupees per month.
 Those who are paying income tax are also not included in PM awas yojana gramin. 
 Professional tax payers also excluded from PM awas yojana gramin.
 Those who owns a landline phone are also not covered under PM awas yojana gramin.
 Those who owns a refrigerator are also not covered under PM awas yojana gramin.
 Landholder of more than 2.5 acres of irrigated land are also kept outside.
 5 acres or more irrigated land for 2 or more crop seasons are not included.
 Households having total land of 7.5 acres (both irrigated or non irrigated) are kept out of Pradhan mantri awas yojana gramin.

Current provisions

Under the Pradhan Mantri Gramin Awas Yojana 2020, the Central Government is providing financial assistance of Rs.1,20,000 for building of pucca house on flat land and the Government is providing financial assistance of Rs.1,30,000 for construction of pucca house in hilly area.

Impact
Since 1985, 25.2 million houses have been constructed under the scheme. Under the Bharat Nirman Phase 1 project, 6 million houses were targeted and 7.1 million actually constructed from 2005–06 to 2008–09. Additional, 12 million houses are planned to be constructed or renovated under the Bharat Nirman Phase 2.

According to the official 2001 figures, the total rural housing shortage was 14.825 million houses.

See also

Housing for All
 scheme in India
Bharat Nirman
Union budget of India
2011 Union Budget of India
District Rural Development Agencies (India)
Minister of Rural Development (India)

References

External links

 Official Website
Pradhan Mantri Awas Yojana- Housing for All (Urban)

Rural development in India
Poverty in India
Housing in India
Government schemes in India
1996 establishments in India